One Note at a Time is a British documentary film directed by Renee Edwards. The film follows New Orleans musicians post-Hurricane Katrina. It is dedicated to the late drummer Herman Roscoe Ernest. The film was officially released in the UK and Ireland in 2018 and is due for release in the US and Canada during 2019.

Background
The film explores the relationship between New Orleans, the musicians, the environment, and the American social welfare system that is unable to support them. Many of the musicians live and work in poverty, going from gig to gig, needing to pay for medical and living expenses. The city, at a tipping point when it comes to supporting the musicians, still needs them for its culture and economy. Much screen time is spent with the New Orleans Musicians' Clinic who struggle to provide medical care to artists too well off for Medicaid and too poor to afford Obamacare.

Filmed over a 4-year period, One Note at a Time is a feature-length documentary that follows the lives of the musicians and the difficulties they face. It highlights young musicians and how the gentrification of the city has brought with it new sound pollution laws, which impact the 24-hour party culture the city has enjoyed.

Featured artists 
One Note at a Time captures new and last interviews with a number of musicians and artist as it tracks them over a 4-year period. Notable musicians featured include: Dr. John, Ben Jaffe, Kermit Ruffins, Charmaine Neville, Al "Carnival Time" Johnson, Ellis Marsalis Jr., Barry Martyn, Herman "Roscoe" Ernest III, Wardell Quezergue, Irma Thomas, Clarke Peters, Donald Harrison, and Delfeayo Marsalis.

Release 
The film was screened at film and music festivals in the UK, Germany and the US in 2017, receiving a number of accolades. The official release by UK and Ireland distributor Munro Films was August 24, 2018, where the film was screened in UK cinemas. The digital film was released on September 3, 2018. The official soundtrack containing a unique live recorded track by New Orleans' icon Dr John was released worldwide by Louisiana Red Hot Records on August 24, 2018. US and Canada digital release by The Golden Media Group, began on April 14, 2019.

Soundtrack

Awards 
The film has won international and domestic festival awards, including:

 Best Feature Documentary – Studio City International Film Festival (2017)
 Gold Winner – Los Angeles Film Review Industry Awards (2017)
 Best Documentary – Nottingham International Film Festival (2017)
 Film of the Festival – Oxford International Film Festival (2017)
 Best Feature Documentary – Oxford International Film Festival (2017)
 Best Score – Oxford International Film Festival (2017)

References

External links 
 
 

2016 films
American documentary films
Documentary films about music and musicians
Documentary films about New Orleans
Documentary films about Hurricane Katrina
British documentary films
2010s English-language films
2010s American films
2010s British films